Joe Saddi is a businessman who is a senior partner and chairman of Strategy&’s (formerly Booz & Company) Middle East business.

Biography
Saddi completed his undergraduate studies at ESSEC in France, and earned an MBA from the Johnson School at Cornell University.

References

Year of birth missing (living people)
Living people
Samuel Curtis Johnson Graduate School of Management alumni
American businesspeople
ESSEC Business School alumni